Galium munzii (Munz's bedstraw) is a species of plant in the family Rubiaceae. It is native to California (Inyo, San Bernardino and Riverside Counties), Arizona (Mohave and Coconino Cos.), Nevada (Clark and Lincoln Cos.), and Utah (Washington and Tooele Cos.).

Galium munzii is a profusely branching, dioecious herb. Leaves are in whorls of 4, broadly egg-shaped or almost round. Flowers are pale green.

Subspecies
Two subspecies are recognized:
 Galium munzii subsp. ambivalens Dempster & Ehrend. – Coconino County
 Galium munzii subsp. munzii  – rest of species range

References

External links
 Calflora Database: Galium munzii (Munz's bedstraw)
 Plant Species of the Bright Angel Trail, Munz's bedstraw

munzii
Flora of California
Flora of Arizona
Flora of Nevada
Flora of Utah
Flora of the California desert regions
Natural history of the Mojave Desert
Natural history of the Grand Canyon
Plants described in 1934
Taxa named by John Thomas Howell
Dioecious plants
Flora without expected TNC conservation status